Vrella or Vrellë (in Albanian), formerly Vrela is a village in Istog municipality, Kosovo.

Demography 
The village has an Albanian ethnic majority.

History 
Vrelo was first mentioned in written sources in 1397, when Princess Milica of Serbia donated the Vrela hamlet to Visoki Dečani monastery. In census from 1485 monastery of Our Lady of Hvosno with 5 monks is mentioned. For a time monastery elder was Makarije Sokolović, future Patriarch of the Serbian Orthodox Church. Near the monastery are remains of an unnamed fort, and high above the place several hermitages have been found.

Notes

References 

Villages in Istog